Hjørdis Grace Grung (née Lehmann, December 2, 1895 – November 14, 1988) was a Norwegian actress.

Career
Grace Grung performed in two one-act plays for the Norwegian Broadcasting Company in 1925. Grung appeared in four film roles between 1931 and 1957. She made her film debut in Tancred Ibsen's Den store barnedåpen.

Family
Grung was the daughter of the shopkeeper Harald Martin Lehmann (1863–1947) and his wife Inger (1871–?). In 1920 she married the architect Leif Grung (1894–1945), with whom she had a son, Geir Grung (1926–1989). She is not to be confused with Leif Grung's cousin, the actress Grace Elisabeth Grung (1889–1974).

Filmography
 1931: Den store barnedåpen
 1942: Jeg drepte! as the surgery nurse
 1950: To mistenkelige personer
 1957: Slalåm under himmelen as the nurse

References

External links
 
 Grace Grung at Filmfront

1895 births
1988 deaths
20th-century Norwegian actresses
Actresses from Chicago